Anton Malloth (13 February 1912 – 31 October 2002) was a supervisor in the "Kleine Festung" (Small Fortress) part of the Theresienstadt concentration camp.

From June 1940 to May 1945, Malloth worked as a supervisor in the Gestapo prison "Kleine Festung Theresienstadt", which was part of the larger Theresienstadt concentration camp. His nickname was "der schöne Toni" (The handsome Toni). He was convicted of beating at least 100 prisoners to death and  sentenced to life imprisonment in 2001, after escaping justice for 55 years.

Life
Malloth grew up in the town of Schenna, near Merano, in the Italian province of South Tyrol.  His foster-parents ran a small agricultural business and guest-house. He did an apprenticeship as a butcher and later became a lance corporal in the Italian army, where he opted to serve in Germany. In Innsbruck he received training as a "Schutzpolizei" (a uniformed branch of the Third Reich police force) and later volunteered for police service in Prague. For most of the Second World War, Malloth worked in Theresienstadt.

Life in Austria
After the end of war, Malloth went on the run for some time, living at his parents-in-laws' home in Wörgl, Tyrol. In early 1948, Malloth was arrested by the Austrian police. In the interrogation in front of a judge in Innsbruck, he played down his role in the Gestapo prison and denied having been involved with torture and murder.

An application for extradition by the Czechoslovak government was ignored by the Austrian justice department. Malloth was tried in absentia in September 1948 in Czechoslovakia for war crimes in Terezín/Theresienstadt, but by then Malloth had already been released by the Austrian court. After numerous witness testimonials, the Czechoslovak court in Litoměřice town ruled that there was no doubt that Malloth had beaten to death about 100 detainees. The verdict was reversed in 1969, but the application for extradition was still pending.

From 1948 to 1988 Malloth lived undisturbed in Meran. In 1952 he became an Italian citizen. When his Italian citizenship was stripped, he became a German citizen in 1957.

In spite of several applications for extradition by Germany and Austria, the German consulate in Milan issued him new passports as the previous ones expired. When he was expelled to Germany in 1988, the public prosecution department of Dortmund denied any extradition to Austria or Czechoslovakia. As there were no preliminary proceedings against Malloth, he was freed.

Life in Germany
From 1988 to 2000, Malloth lived in Pullach near Munich. Gudrun Burwitz, the daughter of Heinrich Himmler, was instructed by the "Stille Hilfe" to rent a comfortable room for him in a home for the aged, which was built on land formerly owned by Rudolf Hess.

When it became public in the late nineties that the social welfare office had paid most of the expenses of Malloth's room, there was much criticism in the German media. The involvement of Himmler's daughter Gudrun Burwitz was also criticized.

Arrest and trial
Malloth was taken into custody on 25 May 2000 and charged by the public prosecution department in Munich. The trial started on 23 April 2001 in the prison in Munich-Stadelheim. On 30 May 2001 Malloth was convicted by the district court of Munich for murder and attempted murder and sentenced to life imprisonment.

Ten days before his death, cancer-suffering Malloth was declared unfit for prison and released.

Literature 
 Oliver Schröm/ Andrea Röpke, Stille Hilfe für braune Kameraden, Christoph Links Verlag, 2002, 
 Ernst Klee, Was sie taten - Was sie wurden, Fischer Taschenbuch (4364), 12. Auflage 1998, 
 Ernst Klee, Persilscheine und falsche Pässe, Fischer Taschenbuch (10956), 5. Aufl. 1991),

External links
 Nikola Friedrich: Wer nicht fühlen will, muß hören?
 Peter Finkelgruen: Der Justizskandal ist noch nicht aufgeklärt
 Thomas Karny: Rechenschaft statt Rache. Nach 56 Jahren steht der SS-Mann Anton Malloth vor Gericht. In: Wiener Zeitung, 25. Mai 2001
 Presse-Infos zum Fall Malloth

1912 births
2002 deaths
Austrian Nazis convicted of war crimes
Theresienstadt concentration camp personnel
Military personnel from Innsbruck
People from Schenna
German people convicted of murder
People from the County of Tyrol
German prisoners sentenced to life imprisonment
Prisoners sentenced to life imprisonment by Germany
Gestapo personnel
German people convicted of attempted murder
People who lost Italian citizenship
People with acquired German citizenship
People deported from Italy
Deaths from cancer in Germany
20th-century Italian military personnel